Police Chief Antek (Antek policmajster) is a 1935 Polish comedy film directed by Michał Waszyński.

Cast
Mieczysława Ćwiklińska...  The Governor's Wife 
Maria Bogda ...  The Governor's Servant 
Adolf Dymsza ...  Antek Król 
Antoni Fertner ...  The Governor 
Konrad Tom ...  Officer 
Wanda Jarszewska ...  The Governor's Older Sister 
Stefania Górska ...  The Governor's Daughter 
Helena Zarembina ...  The Governor's Uglier Sister (as Helena Zarebina) 
Józef Kondrat ...  Felek 
Czesław Skonieczny ...  Police Chief Semyon Fyodorovich Wypiwajlo 
Ludwik Lawiński ...  Barber 
Feliks Chmurkowski ...  The Psychiatrist 
Józef Orwid ...  Russian Businessman 
Stanisław Łapiński ...  Russian Businessman 
Zygmunt Regro-Regirer ...  Orchestra Leader

External links 
 

1935 films
1930s Polish-language films
Polish black-and-white films
Films directed by Michał Waszyński
1935 comedy films
Polish comedy films